Conocephalus dorsalis, the short-winged conehead, is a bush cricket species belonging to the family Tettigoniidae, subfamily Conocephalinae. It is a hygrophilous species, and is therefore common in wet meadows and slow-flowing streams with floating plants,  lowland peatlands, reed beds . It is found throughout Europe and it is common in northern Germany, Britain and southern Scandinavia

References

Orthoptera of Europe
Insects described in 1804
dorsalis